Saint Elizabeth University (SEU) (formerly College of Saint Elizabeth) is a private Catholic, coeducational, four-year, liberal arts university in Morris Township, New Jersey. Portions of the campus are also in Florham Park.

SEU has 25 undergraduate majors, 16 master's degree programs and two doctoral programs (Psy.D. and Ed.D. with two tracks, K-12 leadership, and higher education leadership). The university also offers six combined degree programs, 10 dual degree programs and professional certificate programs in counseling, education, health care, management, ministry, nutrition and other fields.

History
The College of Saint Elizabeth was founded in 1899 by the Sisters of Charity of Saint Elizabeth and was among the first Catholic colleges in the United States to award degrees to women. It is located in a complex which includes the order's motherhouse and convent, as well as a preparatory school for girls. The college began transitioning into a co-educational institution, starting with the 2016 freshman intake. The final all-female class graduated in 2019. The institution was accorded university status by the New Jersey Department of Education as of July 1, 2020.

It is named for Elizabeth Ann Seton (1774–1821), who founded the Sisters of Charity and who, after her death, was canonized as the United States' first native-born saint. (Seton Hall University in New Jersey and Seton Hill University in Pennsylvania are also named after Elizabeth Ann Seton.)

Campus
Saint Elizabeth University is located on the campus of the Sisters of Charity of Saint Elizabeth. The  wooded campus is home to the classical Greek amphitheater built into a hillside and the original dairy farm for the complex.

The Convent Station of NJ Transit, located on the campus of Saint Elizabeth University, provides rail transportation both east and west of Convent Station. The trains are the midtown direct line of the Morris & Essex Lines.

Saint Elizabeth University has eight buildings:  
Santa Rita Hall (Admission, financial aid, administration)
Henderson Hall (Sciences, nursing, foods and nutrition)
Saint Joseph Hall (Athletics, dining hall) 
Santa Maria Hall (Classrooms) 
Mahoney Library (Classrooms, Conklin Academic Success Center)
Annunciation Center (Classrooms, Dolan Performance Hall, academic offices)
O'Connor Hall (student residence)
Founders Hall (student residence)

The classical Greek Theatre is used for concerts and performances. The Shakespeare Garden, completed in 1931, and a greenhouse, built in 1911 also sit on the campus.

Athletics

Saint Elizabeth University teams participate as a member of the National Collegiate Athletic Association's Division III. The Eagles are a member of the Colonial States Athletic Conference (CSAC). Women's sports include basketball, cross country, soccer, softball, tennis and volleyball. Men's sports include baseball, basketball, cross country, soccer, tennis and volleyball.

Notable alumni
 David Clowney (born 1985), wide receiver who played in the NFL for the New York Jets.
 Sister Carmela Marie Cristiano (1927–2011), Sister of Charity of Saint Elizabeth who served the community as a teacher, social worker and activist, who was the first religious sister to run for office in New Jersey.
 Blessed Miriam Teresa Demjanovich (1901–1927; graduated 1923), Sister of Charity of Saint Elizabeth and author of Greater Perfection, who was beatified in 2014.
 Rita Lenihan (1914–1989), officer in the United States Navy who served as Director of the WAVES and Assistant Chief of Naval Personnel for Women from 1966 to 1970.
 Winifred McDonald (1888–1976; BA 1910), politician and schoolteacher who served as Secretary of the State of Connecticut (1949–1951).
 Shirley Tolentino (1943–2010; BA 1965), the first black woman to serve on New Jersey Superior Court and the first black woman appointed to the Jersey City Municipal Court and to serve as its presiding judge.
 Louise Currie Wilmot (born 1942; BA 1964), United States Navy Rear Admiral, who was the first woman to command a United States Naval base.

See also 
 Academy of Saint Elizabeth

References

External links
Official website
Official athletics website

 
Florham Park, New Jersey
Morris Township, New Jersey
Universities and colleges in Morris County, New Jersey
Catholic universities and colleges in New Jersey
Educational institutions established in 1899
Association of Catholic Colleges and Universities
1899 establishments in New Jersey
Liberal arts colleges in New Jersey
Former women's universities and colleges in the United States
History of women in New Jersey